Shuklinka is a rural locality in Shchetinsky Selsoviet Rural Settlement, Kursky District, Kursk Oblast, Russia. Population:

Geography 
The village is located on the Tuskar River (a right tributary of the Seym), 97 km from the Russia–Ukraine border, at the northern border of the district center – the town Kursk, 2 km from the selsoviet center – Shchetinka.

 Streets
There are the following streets in the locality: Glebovskaya, Malinovaya, Pokrovskaya, Troitskaya and Troitsky pereulok (144 houses).

 Climate
Shuklinka has a warm-summer humid continental climate (Dfb in the Köppen climate classification).

Transport 
Shuklinka is located 4.5 km from the federal route  Crimea Highway (a part of the European route ), 1 km from the road of intermunicipal significance  (Kursk – Iskra), on the road  (38N-379 – Shuklinka), 4 km from the railway junction 530 km (railway line Oryol – Kursk).

The rural locality is situated 7 km from Kursk Vostochny Airport, 130 km from Belgorod International Airport and 209 km from Voronezh Peter the Great Airport.

References

Notes

Sources

Rural localities in Kursky District, Kursk Oblast